Mehmet Türkkaya (born 10 March 1964) is a Turkish wrestler. He competed in the men's freestyle 90 kg at the 1988 Summer Olympics.

References

External links
 

1964 births
Living people
Turkish male sport wrestlers
Olympic wrestlers of Turkey
Wrestlers at the 1988 Summer Olympics
Place of birth missing (living people)